Irion County Independent School District is a public school district based in Mertzon, Texas (USA).  Residents of Sherwood, Mertzon, Barnhart, and some residents of Tom Green County attend the school.

In 2009, the school district was rated "recognized" by the Texas Education Agency.

Schools
Irion County High School
Irion County Elementary School

References

External links

Irion County ISD

School districts in Irion County, Texas